The Unpainted Woman is a 1919 American drama film directed by Tod Browning that is based upon a story by Sinclair Lewis. It is not known whether the film currently survives, which suggests that it is a lost film.

Plot
As described in a film magazine, Gudrun Trygavson (MacLaren) is a beautiful Swedish girl living in the American wheat country where she is employed as a "hired girl" by Mrs. Hawes (Titus). Charley Holt (Butler), son from one of the best families in Mullinsdale, cares for Gudrun and asks her to a dance. When Mrs. Hawes informs Charley's mother and sister of this, at the dance the sister cuts in to separate Charley from Gudrun. Charley becomes determined to marry Gudrun, but after they are wed his snobbish relatives cut them off. Charley gets a menial job as a mill worker, and Gudrun and he try to make the best of things, but their life is miserable due to Charley's drinking. A child is born to them, but after five years of hard drinking, Charley is fatally injured in a saloon fight, circumstances which distress Gudrun. Gudrun takes up a small farm with a cabin on it, and works the wheat fields to support her and her child. A "bird of passage" named Martin O'Neill (Hall) comes to the farm, and Gudrun feeds him. In return, he assists in the work and helps bring in the harvest, and when the barn catches fire, saves Gudrun and her child. Martin is suspected of starting the fire, and narrowly survives an attempted lynching by the excited townspeople. It is then discovered that the fire was started by a jealous rival. Gudrun and Martin are later wed.

Cast
 Mary MacLaren as Gudrun Trygavson
 Thurston Hall as Martin O'Neill
 David Butler as Charley Holt
 Laura La Varnie as Mrs. Holt (as Laura Lavarnie)
 Fritzi Ridgeway as Edna (as Fritzie Ridgway)
 Willard Louis as Helnie Lorber
 Carl Stockdale as Pliny
 Lydia Yeamans Titus as Mrs. Hawes
 Michael D. Moore as Olaf (as Mickey Moore)

References

External links

1919 films
1919 drama films
American silent feature films
American black-and-white films
Films based on works by Sinclair Lewis
Films directed by Tod Browning
Silent American drama films
Universal Pictures films
1910s American films
1910s English-language films
English-language drama films